Industrija Motornih Vozil (Industry of motor vehicles; TLA IMV) was a car manufacturer based in Novo Mesto, Slovenia.

IMV logo.jpg

Established in 1954, IMV assembled cars by license from Austin between 1967 and 1972. The cars built were the Austin 1300, the Mini 1000, and the Austin Maxi 1500/1750. In 1972 they signed an agreement with and began cooperating with Renault instead. Independently, IMV produced touring caravans and commercial vehicles of their own design. In 1989, Renault took the complete ownership of IMV's car manufacturing division under the name Revoz, while its touring caravan and motor home division was established as separate business entity in 1995 under the name Adria Mobil.

References

External links

Car manufacturers of Slovenia
Car manufacturers of Yugoslavia
Economy of Novo Mesto